The SuperMotocross World Championship is the premier combined discipline world championship of off-road motorcycle racing. Conceived in 2023 after the AMA Supercross Championship lost its FIM World Championship status, the series will consist of the aforementioned Supercross series and the AMA Motocross Championship, followed by two playoff races and a final to determine the SuperMotocross world champion.

Background

AMA Supercross Championship 

The AMA Supercross Championship (commercially known as Monster Energy AMA Supercross) is the premier American stadium motorcycle racing series. Founded by the American Motorcyclist Association (AMA) in 1974, the AMA Supercross Championship races are held from January through early May. Supercross is a variant of motocross which involves off-road motorcycles on a constructed dirt track consisting of steep jumps and obstacles; the tracks are usually constructed inside a sports stadium. The easy accessibility and comfort of these stadium venues helped supercross surpass off-road motocross as a spectator attraction in the United States by the late 1970s.

The sport of Supercross is best described as motocross racing that takes place within the confines of a sports stadium. The tracks are typically shorter in length than a standard motocross track. They feature a combination of man-made obstacles such as whoop sections (where riders skim along the tops of multiple bumps), rhythm sections (irregular series of jumps with a variety of combination options), and triple jumps (three jumps in a row that riders normally clear in a single leap of 70 feet or more). Many of the turns have banked berms, but some are flat. It takes roughly five hundred truckloads of dirt to make up a supercross track. Soil conditions can be hard-packed, soft, muddy, sandy, rutted, or any combination thereof.

AMA Motocross Championship 

The AMA Motocross Championship (commercially known as Lucas Oil Pro Motocross) is the American national outdoor motorcycle racing series. The motocross race series was founded and sanctioned by the American Motorcyclist Association (AMA) in 1972. The series is the premier motocross competition in the United States and is sanctioned by AMA Pro Racing and managed by MX Sports Pro Racing.

Format 
The Series will be held from January until October, consisting of:

 17 AMA Supercross Championship rounds (January - May)
 11 AMA Motocross Championship rounds (May–September)
 2 SuperMotocross Playoffs and a SuperMotocross World Championship Final

Champions 
SuperMotocross champions are crowned each year, alongside the champions of the individual series which will continue to be awarded.

Television Coverage 
In 2023, the inaugural season will see four broadcast partners, all from the NBC family of networks; NBC, USA Network, CNBC and Peacock.

Source:

See also 

 FIM Supercross World Championship
 Motocross World Championship

References 

AMA Motocross Championship
American Motorcyclist Association
Motocross
Motorcycle off-road racing series
AMA Supercross Championship
Supercross
Feld Entertainment
Motorsport competitions in the United States
Motorsport competitions in Canada